Mohammad Sal Moslehian (محمد صال مصلحیان). (born on 21 March 1966 in Mashhad, Iran) is an Iranian mathematician and a professor of mathematics at Ferdowsi University of Mashhad, Iran. He is the President of the Iranian Mathematical Society for the period of 2021-2024 and an invited member of the Iranian Academy of Sciences. His Erdős number is 3. He is known for his contribution to the operator and norm inequality. He has developed the orthogonality in Hilbert C*-modules  and has significant contributions to operator means. He established noncommutative versions of martingale and maximum inequalities that play an essential role in noncommutative probability spaces. In addition, he has written several expository papers  discussing research and education, as well as promoting mathematics.

Education and career
Moslehian obtained his Ph.D. from the Ferdowsi University of Mashhad under the supervision of Professor Assadollah Niknam in 1999. His research areas include Functional Analysis and Operator Theory, specifically operator algebras and Hilbert C*-modules. He spent his sabbatical leave at the University of Leeds (UK) and Karlstad University (Sweden) in 2006 and 2015 respectively and was a Senior Associate Researcher at the International Centre for Theoretical Physics (ICTP, Trieste) for the period of 2012-2017 and a non-resident researcher of the Institute for Research in Fundamental Sciences during 2006–2007. He supervised more than 20 PhD students.

His most significant scientific-executive responsibilities are as follows:

 The President of the Iranian Mathematical Society (2021-2024).
 A member of the executive committee of the Iranian Mathematical Society (2004-2012) & (2021-2024). 
 An invited member of the Academy of Sciences (2015-).
 Vice Dean of the Faculty of Mathematical Science at Ferdowsi University of Mashhad (2003-2004).
 Director of Center of Excellence in Analysis on Algebraic Structures (2007-).
 General Director of Graduate Studies at Ferdowsi University of Mashhad (2008-2012).
 Vice-Dean (Research Affairs) of the Faculty of Mathematical Science at Ferdowsi University of Mashhad (2016-2018).
 General Director of Research at the Ferdowsi University of Mashhad (2018-).
 The founder and director of the "Tusi Mathematical Research Group", Iran.

Editorial board
He is the founder and the editor-in-chief of three mathematics journals: Banach Journal of Mathematical Analysis, Annals of Functional Analysis, and Advances in Operator Theory that are published by Springer Nature/Birkhäuser as well as being the editor-in-chief of the Bulletin of the Iranian Mathematical Society (2010-2011) and the Newsletter of the Iranian Mathematical Society (2004-2007)

Awards and honors 
Some of Moslehian's most important awards/honors for his contributions to mathematics include:

 A gold medal (third place) at the Annual Iranian Student Competition in Mathematics (مسابفه ریاضی دانشجویی کشوری) organized by the Iranian Mathematical Society (1989).
 A gold medal and award from Ferdowsi Academic Foundation (بنیاد دانشگاهی فردوسی) as the distinguished academic member in Basic Sciences (2011).
 The Razavi Scientific award (نشان علمی رضوی) as an elected researcher in Basic Sciences by the governor-general of Razavi Khorasan Province (2016).
 An award as a distinguished researcher elected by Ministry of Science, Research and Technology and a certificate from the first vice president of Iran (2018).
 Recipient of the national Allame Tabatabaei Award (جايزه علامه طباطبايى) and certificate from a vice president of Iran (2019).

Books
 General Topology (with A. Niknam), Ferdowsi Univ. Press, Mashad, 2005. (in Persian)

Selected journal articles

References

External links 
Prof. M. S. Moslehian's Homepage

1966 births
Living people
Iranian mathematicians